The 2019 Plano municipal election was an election to the Plano City Council in the city of Plano, Texas on May 4, 2019. Seats were contested for Places 1, 3, 5, and 7.

Since no candidate received more than 50% of the vote in Places 5 and 7, a runoff was held on June 8, 2019, for these races.

Council seats

Place 1 
The incumbent, Angela Miner, did not run for re-election. Bill Lisle III, Daniel Long, and Maria Tu ran for the open seat.

Place 3 
The incumbent, Rick Grady, ran for re-election. Colleen Aguilar-Epstein challenged him.

Place 5 
The incumbent, Ron Kelley, ran for re-election. Bryon Abraham Bradford and Shelby Williams challenged him.

Runoff 
No candidate received 50% of the votes, so a runoff election was held on June 8, 2019.

Place 7 
The incumbent, Tom Harrison, did not run for re-election. Ann Bacchus, Leilei "Lily" Bao, and LaShon Ross ran for the open seat.

Runoff 
No candidate received 50% of the votes, so a runoff election was held on June 8, 2019.

Propositions

Proposition A 
The following question appeared on the ballot:

Proposition B 
The following question appeared on the ballot:

Proposition C 
The following question appeared on the ballot:

References

Local elections in Texas